Marc P. Bernegger is a Swiss-based web entrepreneur and Fintech investor. He is known for founding usgang.ch as well as Amiando. He is also known as an advocate of entrepreneurship, FinTech and cryptocurrency in Switzerland.

Bernegger is also known for being investor in several startups and for serving on the board of multiple organizations including Swiss Blockchain Federation, Falcon Private Bank, Finleap etc. He has been known to establish his own investing firm Bernegger Ventures, in 2007. Bernegger has been nominated as one of the "100 most successful Swiss under the age of 40" by BILANZ magazine. and also as one of "The 100 most influential technology investors in Europe" by Telegraph.

Early life and education
Bernegger was born in Zurich in 1979 and raised in Switzerland. He holds a Master of Law degree from University of Zurich.

Career
In 1999, Bernegger co-founded usgang.ch; a night-life platform. Consequently, he joined University of Zurich for pursuing master's degree in Law in 2001. After completing his studies in 2015, he worked as a lawyer for one year. In 2006, he co-founded Amiando, an online platform for event registration and ticketing. He joined as a board member at Pioneer's Club PCU, in the same year. In 2007, he founded Bernegger Ventures, through which he is known for investing in several startups. In 2008, Axel Springer acquired usgang.ch for an undisclosed sum. During December  2009, Amiando was recognized as Global Technology Pioneer by the World Economic Forum and the organization was later sold to XING in the next year.

Bernegger is also known for supporting and the development of entrepreneurship in Switzerland. He has been known for advocating cryptocurrency economy in parallel to the mainstream economy. In 2011, he joined as the BOD member at Next Generation Finance Management.  In 2013, he co-founded, Finance 2.0, the first FinTech conference in Switzerland. He joined as BOD member at Greater Zurich Area in 2014. Bernegger joined as a senior advisor and Ambassador of Switzerland at FinLeap in 2015. During 2017, Bernegger joined the board of Falcon Private Bank, CfC St. Moritz and Crypto Finance AG. In 2018, he associated himself with Swiss Blockchain Federation as founding board member.  In 2020, Marc has joined the Expert network for blockchain and digital economy of World economic forum. In 2021 he co-founded the Swiss based longevity company Builder Maximon.

Awards and honors
 30 most important digital heads in Switzerland by Handelszeitung
 100 most successful people under 40 in Switzerland by Bilanz
 Newcomer of the Year 2010 by Swiss ICT
100 most influential technology investors in Europe by Telegraph

See also
 Amiando
XING
Axel Springer SE

References

1979 births
Swiss investors
Living people